The Element of Sonic Defiance is an EP by Strung Out, released on Fat Wreck Chords. It contains one of their most popular songs, "Mephisto". It was recorded in February 2000.

Track listing
"Mission To Mars" – 2:37 (Jake Kiley)
"Scarecrow" – 2:14 (Jake)
"Savant" – 3:21 (Jake)
"Blew" – 4:33 (Rob Ramos, Jake)
"Everyday" – 2:22 (Rob)
"Razorblade" – 3:59 (Rob, Jake)
"Jackie-O" – 3:02 (Jake)
"Mephisto" – 2:51 (Jason Cruz, Jake)

"Andre's Circus", as fans have dubbed it, is appended to the end of "Blew". The speech is an excerpt from the movie My Dinner with Andre.

Miscellaneous
All of the leads are by Rob Ramos except for "Scarecrow", which is by Jake Kiley.
"Scarecrow" and "Mephisto" were featured in the PlayStation 2 game ATV Offroad Fury.
"Everyday" was featured in the opening credits of the PlayStation 2 game ESPN Winter X-Games Snowboarding.

Credits
 Jason Cruz - Lead vocals, Art direction, Design
 Jake Kiley - Guitar
 Rob Ramos - Guitar
 Chris Aiken - Bass
 Jordan Burns - Drums
Ramon Breton - Mastering
Adam Krammer - Assistant
Nick Rubenstein - Art Direction, Design

References

Strung Out albums
2002 EPs
Fat Wreck Chords EPs